Microfilistata is a genus of Asian crevice weavers that was first described by S. L. Zonstein in 1990.  it contains only three species: M. magalhaesi, M. ovchinnikovi, and M. tyshchenkoi.

References

Araneomorphae genera
Filistatidae
Spiders of Asia